The Aleksandrovo tomb is a Thracian burial mound and tomb excavated near Aleksandrovo, Haskovo Province, South-Eastern Bulgaria, dated to c. 4th century BCE.

On December 17, 2000 the tomb was accidentally uncovered by an earth-moving machine. Looters subsequently entered the tomb, damaging some of its frescoes. Both the antechamber and main chamber are decorated with well-preserved frescoes that reflect the artist's knowledge of Late Classical and Early Hellenistic art. The fresco in the main chamber depicts a hunting scene where a boar is attacked by a mounted hunter and a naked man wielding a double-axe. The double-axe is interpreted as representing royal power, the naked man as representing Zalmoxis, the Thracian solar god corresponding to Zeus.

A graffito in the chamber inscribed with the Thracian name Kozemases indicates either the tomb's noble patron or its artist.

The Thracian tomb of Alexandrovo is dated at early 4th century BCE. Wall paintings exhibit the change in appearance due to Greek influence. In the wall-paintings beards, tattoos, cloaks, boots, hats, top-knots have disappeared. Greek footwear replaces their boots. The tomb may be that of Triballi.

Also other changes are seen such as Thracians wearing gold or bronze torcs around their necks (usually three).

Gallery

See also
 Thracian tomb of Cotys I
 Thracian tomb Golyama Arsenalka
 Thracian tomb Griffins
 Thracian tomb Helvetia
 Thracian Tomb of Kazanlak
 Thracian tomb Ostrusha
 Thracian tomb of Seuthes III
 Thracian tomb Shushmanets
 Thracian Tomb of Sveshtari
 Valley of the Thracian Rulers
 Roman Tomb (Silistra)

Tombs in Bulgaria
Thracian sites

Notes

Buildings and structures completed in the 4th century BC
Thracian sites
Archaeological sites in Bulgaria
Kurgans
2001 in Bulgaria
2001 in science
Buildings and structures in Haskovo Province
Tombs in Bulgaria
History of Haskovo Province
2000 archaeological discoveries